Clavelle is a surname. Notable people with the surname include: 

Peter Clavelle (born 1949), American politician
Shannon Clavelle (born 1973), American football player

See also
Clavell